Beenalaght (An Seisear in Irish, meaning The Six) is an alignment of six standing stones located on a flat pasture in Reanthesure, 0.5km west of the village of Bweeng, County Cork, Ireland. It is 13.6km (8.5 miles) south-west of Mallow, on a hill to the west of the Mallow-Coachford Road. (grid ref: 485 873, Latitude: 52.035818N  Longitude: 8.751181W)

See also
 List of megalithic monuments in Cork

References

Sources
McNally, Kenneth (2006). "Ireland's Ancient Stones" (Belfast: Appletree Press).

External links
Beenalaght stone row at Megalithomania.com
Irish Megaliths - Photographs of Beenalaght

Megalithic monuments in Ireland
Archaeological sites in County Cork